Fontane Bianche is a southern Italian hamlet (frazione) of Syracuse in Sicily.

It has a population of 889.

References

External links
 

Frazioni of the Province of Syracuse